Tony Mark McKnight (born June 29, 1977) is a retired Major League Baseball pitcher. He played during two seasons at the major league level for the Houston Astros and Pittsburgh Pirates. He was drafted by the Astros in the 1st round (22nd pick) of the  amateur draft.

On July 31, 2001, the Astros traded McKnight to the Pirates for Mike Williams.

Prior to the 2017 college baseball season, McKnight began volunteering as an assistant coach for the baseball team at Texas A&M University–Texarkana.

References

External links

1977 births
Living people
Baseball players from Arkansas
Gulf Coast Astros players
Houston Astros players
Jackson Generals (Texas League) players
Kissimmee Cobras players
Las Vegas 51s players
Major League Baseball pitchers
Nashville Sounds players
New Orleans Zephyrs players
Pittsburgh Pirates players
Quad Cities River Bandits players
Round Rock Express players
Texas A&M–Texarkana Eagles baseball coaches